The 2019 DPA Tour consisted of 30 darts tournaments on the 2019 PDC Pro Tour.

Prize money
Each event had a prize fund of A$4,000.

This is how the prize money is divided:

February

DPA Tour 1
DPA Tour 1 was contested on Friday 1 February 2019 at the Warilla Bowls and Recreation Club in Barrack Heights.

DPA Tour 2
DPA Tour 2 was contested on Saturday 2 February 2019 at the Warilla Bowls and Recreation Club in Barrack Heights.

DPA Tour 3
DPA Tour 3 was contested on Saturday 2 February 2019 at the Warilla Bowls and Recreation Club in Barrack Heights.

DPA Tour 4
DPA Tour 4 was contested on Sunday 3 February 2019 at the Warilla Bowls and Recreation Club in Barrack Heights.

March

DPA Tour 5
DPA Tour 5 was contested on Friday 1 March 2019 at the Pine Rivers Darts Club in Brisbane.

DPA Tour 6
DPA Tour 6 was contested on Saturday 2 March 2019 at the Pine Rivers Darts Club in Brisbane.

DPA Tour 7
DPA Tour 7 was contested on Saturday 2 March 2019 at the Pine Rivers Darts Club in Brisbane.

DPA Tour 8
DPA Tour 8 was contested on Sunday 3 March 2019 at the Pine Rivers Darts Club in Brisbane.

April

DPA Tour 9
DPA Tour 9 was contested on Friday 5 April 2019 at the East Devonport Recreation Centre in Devonport.

DPA Tour 10
DPA Tour 10 was contested on Saturday 6 April 2019 at the East Devonport Recreation Centre in Devonport.

DPA Tour 11
DPA Tour 11 was contested on Saturday 6 April 2019 at the East Devonport Recreation Centre in Devonport.

DPA Tour 12
DPA Tour 12 was contested on Sunday 7 April 2019 at the East Devonport Recreation Centre in Devonport.

May

DPA Tour 13
DPA Tour 13 was contested on Thursday 2 May 2019 at the Macquarie INN in Dubbo.

DPA Tour 14
DPA Tour 14 was contested on Friday 3 May 2019 at the Macquarie INN in Dubbo.

DPA Tour 15
DPA Tour 15 was contested on Friday 3 May 2019 at the Macquarie INN in Dubbo.

DPA Tour 16
DPA Tour 16 was contested on Saturday 4 May 2019 at the Macquarie INN in Dubbo.

DPA Tour 17
DPA Tour 17 was contested on Saturday 4 May 2019 at the Macquarie INN in Dubbo.

DPA Tour 18
DPA Tour 18 was contested on Sunday 5 May 2019 at the Macquarie INN in Dubbo.

DPA Tour 19
DPA Tour 19 was contested on Friday 31 May 2019 at the Cobram Sports Club in Barooga.

June

DPA Tour 20
DPA Tour 20 was contested on Saturday 1 June 2019 at the Cobram Sports Club in Barooga.

DPA Tour 21
DPA Tour 21 was contested on Saturday 1 June 2019 at the Cobram Sports Club in Barooga.

DPA Tour 22
DPA Tour 22 was contested on Sunday 2 June 2019 at the Cobram Sports Club in Barooga.

September

DPA Tour 23
DPA Tour 23 was contested on Friday 20 September 2019 at the Seaford Hotel in Melbourne.

DPA Tour 24
DPA Tour 24 was contested on Saturday 21 September 2019 at the Seaford Hotel in Melbourne.

DPA Tour 25
DPA Tour 25 was contested on Saturday 21 September 2019 at the Seaford Hotel in Melbourne.

DPA Tour 26
DPA Tour 26 was contested on Sunday 22 September 2019 at the Seaford Hotel in Melbourne.

October

DPA Tour 27
DPA Tour 27 was contested on Friday 11 October 2019 at the Labour Club in Canberra.

DPA Tour 28
DPA Tour 28 was contested on Saturday 12 October 2019 at the Labour Club in Canberra.

DPA Tour 29
DPA Tour 29 was contested on Saturday 12 October 2019 at the Labour Club in Canberra.

DPA Tour 30
DPA Tour 30 was contested on Sunday 13 October 2019 at the Labour Club in Canberra.

References

2019 in darts
2019 PDC Pro Tour